Machent is a surname. Notable people with the surname include:

 Arthur Machent (1910–1996), English footballer
 Stan Machent (1921–2012), English footballer